Brachychiton discolor is a rainforest tree of eastern Australia. It grows in drier rainforest areas. Scattered from Paterson, New South Wales (32° S) to Mackay, Queensland (21° S). There is also an isolated community of these trees at Cape York Peninsula.

Common names include lacebark tree, lace kurrajong, pink kurrajong, scrub bottle tree, white kurrajong, hat tree and sycamore.

Description 
An attractive tree up to 30 metres tall featuring pink flowers without petals. The trunk is straight, grey and cylindrical, up to 75 cm in diameter. Not buttressed at the base. Twigs hairy, brown and smooth.

Leaves are hairy; lobed in three, five or seven points. 10 to 20 cm in diameter. Whitish underneath, dark green above. Leaf veins visible on both sides.

Flowers form from November to February. The flowers are pink, almost without stalks, 3 to 4 cm in diameter. Separate male and female flowers without petals. The fruit is a hairy boat shaped follicle maturing from December to July. 7 to 20 cm long, containing up to 30 seeds, 9 mm long. Germination from fresh seed occurs without difficulty.

Uses 
Widely planted as an ornamental tree. Wood used as shields by Indigenous Australians. Roasted seeds edible to humans.

References

  (other publication details, included in citation)

discolor
Malvales of Australia
Trees of Australia
Flora of New South Wales
Flora of Queensland
Ornamental trees
Edible nuts and seeds
Taxa named by Ferdinand von Mueller